Graham Appo (born 11 July 1974) is an Indigenous Australian former professional rugby league footballer of the 1990s and 2000s. He played throughout the back-line during his long career and was also a talented goal-kicker. Appo started playing first-grade club football in the New South Wales Rugby League premiership for the Canberra Raiders in 1994, winning the club's rookie of the year award. Early in the 1998 season, he joined the Adelaide Rams for their final season in the NRL, setting club records for most tries in a match (3), most tries in a season (12), most goals in a match (8), most points in a match (24) and most points for a season (116). He then moved to the Sydney City Roosters and later the North Queensland Cowboys for a season each.

Appo embarked on a career in the English Super League after the 2000 NRL season. In England, he played for the Huddersfield Giants and Warrington Wolves. He was later named in that year's Super League Dream Team.

References

External links
Graham Appo at yesterdayshero.com.au
Graham Appo at stats.rleague.com

1974 births
Living people
Adelaide Rams players
Australian expatriate rugby league players
Australian expatriate sportspeople in England
Australian people of Papua New Guinean descent
Australian rugby league players
Canberra Raiders players
Expatriate rugby league players in England
Huddersfield Giants players
North Queensland Cowboys players
Rugby league players from Gold Coast, Queensland
Rugby league wingers
Sydney Roosters players
Warrington Wolves players